Honor Rising: Japan 2016 was a two-day professional wrestling "supershow" event co-produced by the Japanese New Japan Pro-Wrestling (NJPW) and American Ring of Honor (ROH) promotions. The event took place on February 19 and 20, 2016, at Korakuen Hall in Tokyo, Japan. Both shows aired live through NJPW's internet streaming site, NJPW World. Matches from the shows also began airing on Ring of Honor Wrestling in April 2016.

Continuing the partnership between NJPW and ROH, these were the first co-produced shows between the two promotions to take place in Japan. In 2014 and 2015, the two held joint shows, entitled Global Wars and War of the Worlds, in Canada and the United States.

Production

Background
On August 21, 2015, at a Ring of Honor (ROH) show in Philadelphia, Pennsylvania, ROH's chief operating officer Joe Koff, ambassador Cary Silkin and on-screen authority figure Nigel McGuinness were joined by New Japan Pro-Wrestling (NJPW) chairman Naoki Sugabayashi and referee Tiger Hattori for an announcement about the continuation of a working relationship between the two promotions. The relationship originally started in 2014 with the Global Wars and War of the Worlds shows, co-produced between the two promotions in May, which were followed by War of the Worlds '15 and Global Wars '15 in May 2015. The relationship also included NJPW wrestlers making sporadic appearances in ROH and vice versa. It was announced that in 2016, the two promotions would hold joint shows in Japan in February and in North America in May. On November 19, 2015, ROH announced that the Japanese shows would be held on February 19 and 20 in Tokyo's Korakuen Hall. These would mark ROH's first shows in Japan since 2008, when they held shows in Tokyo as part of their then relationships with both Dragon Gate and Pro Wrestling Noah. On December 8, NJPW announced the name of the shows as "Honor Rising: Japan 2016".

On January 30, 2016, NJPW announced the eleven ROH wrestlers taking part in the event; Adam Cole, Bobby Fish, Dalton Castle, Delirious, Jay Briscoe, Jay Lethal, Kyle O'Reilly, Mark Briscoe, Michael Elgin, Moose and Roderick Strong. It was also reported that Doc Gallows and Karl Anderson would take part in the event, which mark their final NJPW appearances before leaving the promotion for WWE. On February 12, ROH announced that Adam Cole would not be able to make the shows due to "personal family issues" and replaced him with Frankie Kazarian, and also added Matt Sydal and The Young Bucks (Matt Jackson and Nick Jackson), who were regulars for both ROH and NJPW.

NJPW released the cards for the shows on February 15. Both shows would feature eight matches each with three of them being contested for championships. The February 19 show would be main evented by Roderick Strong defending the ROH World Television Championship against Tomohiro Ishii. The February 20 show would feature Jay Briscoe, Mark Briscoe and Toru Yano defending the NEVER Openweight 6-Man Tag Team Championship against the Bullet Club trio of Kenny Omega and The Young Bucks, while the main event saw Jay Lethal defend the ROH World Championship against Tomoaki Honma.

Results
February 19

February 20

References

External links
Official New Japan Pro-Wrestling website 
Official Ring of Honor website

Honor Rising: Japan
2016 in professional wrestling
Events in Tokyo
Professional wrestling in Tokyo
2016 in Tokyo
February 2016 events in Japan